Terry Allen Jorgensen (born September 2, 1966) is an American former professional baseball third baseman.

Terry was originally selected by the Twins in the 2nd round of the 1987 Major League Baseball Draft out of the University of Wisconsin–Oshkosh. He started playing in 1989, when he played 10 games, but hit only .174 with 1 double. His best chance at regular major league playing time came in 1993, when he played in 59 games for the Twins, but he hit just .224 with 12 RBI, and he was released after the season. He played two seasons in the Florida Marlins organization, then one season for the independent Green Bay Sultans before retiring after the  season.

After retirement as a player, he became the coach for his high school team at Luxemburg-Casco High School. His younger brother, Tim Jorgensen, also played for Wisconsin–Oshkosh.

References

External links

Major League Baseball third basemen
Minnesota Twins players
Kenosha Twins players
Orlando Twins players
Portland Beavers players
Portland Sea Dogs players
Charlotte Knights players
Green Bay Sultans players
Baseball players from Wisconsin
People from Kewaunee, Wisconsin
Wisconsin–Oshkosh Titans baseball players
1966 births
Living people
Anchorage Glacier Pilots players
High school baseball coaches in the United States